Brown v. Mississippi, 297 U.S. 278 (1936), was a United States Supreme Court case that ruled that a defendant's involuntary confession that is extracted by the use of force on the part of law enforcement cannot be entered as evidence and violates the Due Process Clause of the Fourteenth Amendment.

Facts of the case
Raymond Stewart, a white planter, was murdered in Kemper County, Mississippi on March 30, 1934. Arthur Ellington, Ed Brown, and Henry Shields, three black tenant farmers, were arrested for his murder. At the trial, the prosecution's principal evidence was the defendants' confessions to police officers. During the trial, however, prosecution witnesses freely admitted that the defendants confessed only after being subjected to brutal whippings by the officers:

"... defendants were made to strip and they were laid over chairs and their backs were cut to pieces with a leather strap with buckles on it, and they were likewise made by the said deputy definitely to understand that the whipping would be continued unless and until they confessed, and not only confessed, but confessed in every matter of detail as demanded by those present; and in this manner the defendants confessed the crime, and, as the whippings progressed and were repeated, they changed or adjusted their confession in all particulars of detail so as to conform to the demands of their torturers. When the confessions had been obtained in the exact form and contents as desired by the mob, they left with the parting admonition and warning that, if the defendants changed their story at any time in any respect from that last stated, the perpetrators of the outrage would administer the same or equally effective treatment." 

One defendant had also been subjected to being strung up by his neck from a tree in addition to the whippings. The confessions were nevertheless admitted into evidence, and were the only evidence used in the subsequent one-day trial. The defendants were convicted by a jury and sentenced to be hanged. The convictions were affirmed by the Mississippi Supreme Court on appeal. In Chief Justice Virgil Alexis Griffith's dissent, he wrote "the transcript reads more like pages torn from some medieval account than a record made within the confines of a modern civilization."

Judgment
In a unanimous decision, the Court reversed the convictions of the defendants. It held that a defendant's confession that was extracted by police violence cannot be entered as evidence and violates the Due Process Clause of the Fourteenth Amendment.

Aftermath
Upon remand from the United States Supreme Court, the three defendants pleaded nolo contendere to manslaughter rather than risk a retrial. They were however sentenced to six months, two and one-half years, and seven and one-half years in prison, respectively.

The prosecutor at the trial level, John Stennis, later served forty-two years as a United States Senator, including two years as President pro tempore. He ran for office in Mississippi thirteen times and never lost.

See also
Confession (legal)
Chambers v. Florida (1940)
List of criminal competencies
List of United States Supreme Court cases, volume 297
Miranda v. Arizona (1966)
Scottsboro Boys

References

Further reading

External links

 

Police brutality in the United States
United States Supreme Court cases
United States Supreme Court cases of the Hughes Court
United States Fifth Amendment self-incrimination case law
1936 in United States case law
Civil rights movement case law
Incorporation case law
False confessions
Torture in the United States
Kemper County, Mississippi